Vrachesh Glacier is the 10.3 km long and 2.7 km wide glacier on Nordenskjöld Coast in Graham Land situated southwest of Kladorub Glacier and northeast of Enravota Glacier.  It drains the southeast slopes of Detroit Plateau, flows southeastwards, and south of Papiya Nunatak turns east to enter Desislava Cove in Weddell Sea northeast of Richard Knoll.  The feature is named after the settlement of Vrachesh in Western Bulgaria.

Location
British mapping in 1978.

Maps
 British Antarctic Territory.  Scale 1:200000 topographic map.  DOS 610 Series, Sheet W 64 60.  Directorate of Overseas Surveys, Tolworth, UK, 1978.
 Antarctic Digital Database (ADD). Scale 1:250000 topographic map of Antarctica. Scientific Committee on Antarctic Research (SCAR). Since 1993, regularly upgraded and updated.

References
 Vrachesh Glacier. SCAR Composite Antarctic Gazetteer.
 Bulgarian Antarctic Gazetteer. Antarctic Place-names Commission. (details in Bulgarian, basic data in English)

External links
 Vrachesh Glacier. Copernix satellite image

Glaciers of Nordenskjöld Coast
Bulgaria and the Antarctic